Tephritis bardanae is a picture-winged fly of the family Tephritidae, which are variously known as fruit-flies (North America) or gall flies (Britain and Ireland).

The larvae feed in the flower-heads (capitula) of species of Arctium (burdocks), causing galls to form.

The larvae pupates in autumn, forming a black puparium.

References

Bibliography

External links
 Eakring Birds
 NatureSpot
 Fauna Europaea

Tephritinae
Diptera of Europe
Gall-inducing insects
Insects described in 1803
Taxa named by Franz von Paula Schrank